Zeugophora abnormis is a species of megalopodid leaf beetle in the family Megalopodidae. It is found in North America.

References

Further reading

 

Megalopodidae
Articles created by Qbugbot
Beetles described in 1850